Álvaro José Novo Milhazes (born 26 April 1997) is a Portuguese footballer who plays for Leça as a defender.

Football career
He made his professional debut for Varzim on 8 November 2020 in the Liga Portugal 2.

References

External links

1997 births
Living people
Portuguese footballers
Association football defenders
Campeonato de Portugal (league) players
Liga Portugal 2 players
A.D. Nogueirense players
S.C. Salgueiros players
Sertanense F.C. players
Varzim S.C. players
SC São João de Ver players
Leça F.C. players
People from Póvoa de Varzim
Sportspeople from Porto District